Oak Grove is a historic building and estate in Church Hill, Jefferson County, Mississippi, United States.

Location
It is located at number 13582 on the Highway 533 in Church Hill, Mississippi.

Overview
Oak Grove was created by James G. Wood as a residence for his daughter Jane (Wood) Payne and her husband James Payne. By 1860 Jane C. Payne owned 33 slaves in Jefferson County. It was built in 1828. The architectural style is at once Greek Revival and Federal.

It has been listed on the National Register of Historic Places since February 22, 1979.

References

Houses completed in 1828
Houses on the National Register of Historic Places in Mississippi
Houses in Jefferson County, Mississippi
Greek Revival houses in Mississippi
Federal architecture in Mississippi
National Register of Historic Places in Jefferson County, Mississippi